"Take My Breath" is a song by Canadian singer the Weeknd. It was released on August 6, 2021, through XO and Republic Records, as the lead single from his fifth studio album, Dawn FM (2022). The song was written and produced by the Weeknd, Max Martin and Oscar Holter, with Belly, Andrea Di Ceglie, and Luigi Tutolo receiving additional songwriting credits.

A disco, dance-pop, funk and synthwave track with psychedelic elements, "Take My Breath" was met with widespread critical acclaim for the Weeknd's vocals and its production, which was influenced by the beats and synthesizers of the 1980s. The song debuted at number six on the US Billboard Hot 100, marking the Weeknd's thirteenth top 10 entry.

Background and promotion
The Weeknd first teased that he was working on a new album in September 2020, via an interview with Rolling Stone in which he stated "I might have another album ready to go by the time this quarantine is over". Later on during the 2021 Billboard Music Awards in May, he went on to state in his acceptance speech "I just want to say the After Hours are done and The Dawn is coming." Throughout June and July, the Weeknd continued to mention his upcoming project under the tentative title The Dawn by revealing a new transitional look. He also released the singles "You Right" with Doja Cat and "Better Believe" with Belly and Young Thug during that period.

On August 2, 2021, a snippet of "Take My Breath" with a visual of a sunrise titled "The Dawn Is Coming" and a GQ cover story was released in anticipation of new music. The title of the single and its release date of August 6 was confirmed later that day through a promotional video for the 2020 Summer Olympics, which featured hurdlers Sydney McLaughlin and Dalilah Muhammad, middle-distance runner Athing Mu and sprinter Gabrielle Thomas.

Lyrics and composition 
"Take My Breath" has been described by music critics as a disco, dance-pop, funk and synthwave track with elements of psychedelia. The single and radio version of the song runs for a duration of three minutes and forty seconds, while the extended version has a length of five minutes and fifty-one seconds. Also, the album version of the song runs for a duration of five minutes and thirty-nine seconds, which segues from the preceding track "How Do I Make You Love Me?". It was written in the key of C minor with a tempo of 121 beats per minute. Lyrically, the song details an entanglement in a romantic relationship that ultimately leads to autoerotic asphyxiation.

Critical reception
"Take My Breath" received widespread critical acclaim. The vocals and production of the track received praise from Billboards Joe Lynch, who compared the latter aspect's usage of a synthesizer to the synth riff that was used in Donna Summer's 1977 single "I Feel Love". Ben Beaumont-Thomas of The Guardian gave the song a five-star rating, stating that it is "an instant disco-pop masterpiece". Consequence of Sound writer Mary Siroky complimented "Take My Breath", “the music is pulsing, almost dizzying in its dance-floor intensity from start to finish, leaving the listener appropriately breathless”. Chief critic Jon Pareles of The New York Times highlighted the record’s retro appeal, “the disco thump, electric piano chords and call-and-response falsetto vocals in "Take My Breath" hark back to vintage Bee Gees. Journalist Quinn Moreland from Pitchfork complimented the intro and chorus, “from the strutting intro to the extremely infectious melody, "Take My Breath" is full of life”.

Year-end lists

Accolades

Music video
The music video for "Take My Breath" was first teased by the Weeknd on social media via self-released images of the visual during the week leading up to the release of the single. Directed by Cliqua, it originally was supposed to play before IMAX showings of The Suicide Squad, but was reportedly pulled due to epilepsy concerns in regards to the pervasive strobe lighting in the video. The video was released alongside the song on August 6, 2021.

The video starts with the Weeknd walking outside overlooking a sunrise, before entering a nightclub with pulsating strobe lights. Upon entering the club, he meets his love interest, played by actress and stuntwoman Shaina West. The two dance together and exchange breaths through an oxygen tank, before the Weeknd's breath is literally taken away as he gets strangled by West's braids. The video ends with the Weeknd regaining his breath and consciousness as he is seen lying down on the club floor with a snippet of "Sacrifice" playing in the background. As of early 2022, the video has over 100 million views on YouTube.

Use in media
"Take My Breath" was used as the theme song for WWE's 2021 pay-per-view Crown Jewel.

Track listing 
Digital single #1
 "Take My Breath" – 3:40

Digital single #2 / CD Maxi-single
 "Take My Breath" – 3:40
 "Take My Breath" (Instrumental) – 3:40
 "Take My Breath" (Extended Version) – 5:51

Personnel

 The Weeknd – songwriting, vocals, production, programming, keyboards, bass, drums
 Belly – songwriting
 Max Martin – songwriting, production, programming, keyboards, bass, drums
 Oscar Holter – songwriting, production, programming, keyboards, bass, drums
 Elvira Anderfjärd – background vocals
 David Bukovinsky – cello
 Shellback – drums
 Magnus Sjölander – percussion
 Mattias Bylund – strings
 Mattias Johansson – violin
 Sam Holland – engineering, studio personnel
 Şerban Ghenea – mixing, studio personnel
 Dave Kutch – mastering, studio personnel

Charts

Weekly charts

Year-end charts

Certifications

Release history

References

External links
  
  
  
  
  
  
 
 

2021 singles
2021 songs
Republic Records singles
Songs written by the Weeknd
The Weeknd songs
Songs written by Belly (rapper)
Songs written by Max Martin
Songs written by Oscar Holter
Song recordings produced by the Weeknd
Song recordings produced by Max Martin
Number-one singles in Israel
Disco songs
Funk songs
Synthwave songs
Canadian dance-pop songs